is a passenger railway station in the city of Midori, Gunma, Japan, operated by the private railway operators Tōbu Railway and the Jōmō Electric Railway.

Lines

Station layout
Akagi Station has one island platform for the Jōmō Line and one bay platform serving two tracks for the Tōbu Kiryū Line, with both sets of platforms elevated with the station building underneath. Both companies share the same set of ticket barriers.

Platforms

Adjacent stations

History
The Tōbu Railway station opened on 18 March 1932. The station was renamed Akagi Station on 1 November 1958.

From 17 March 2012, station numbering was introduced on all Tōbu lines, with Akagi Station becoming "TI-57".

Passenger statistics
In fiscal 2019, the Tōbu station was used by an average of 1201 passengers daily (boarding passengers only).

Surrounding area
 Former Ōmama town hall
 Ōmama Post Office
 Ōmama-Minami Elementary School

See also
 List of railway stations in Japan

References

External links

 Tobu Railway station information 
 Jomo Railway station information 
	

Tobu Kiryu Line
Stations of Jōmō Electric Railway
Stations of Tobu Railway
Railway stations in Gunma Prefecture
Railway stations in Japan opened in 1928
Midori, Gunma